O5 or O-5 may refer to:

 The "Outreach 5", emerging economies in the Heiligendamm Process: China, Mexico, India, Brazil and South Africa
 A symbol for the anti-Nazi Austrian Resistance, where the 5 stands for E and OE is the abbreviation of Österreich
 USS O-5 (SS-66), a 1917 O-class submarine
 HNLMS O 5, a 1913 O 2 class submarine of the Royal Netherlands Navy
 SM UC-99, a U-boat renamed O-5 for Japanese service from 1920 to 1921
 Douglas World Cruiser, also designated as Douglas O-5
 De Havilland Canada Dash 7, also designated as De Havilland Canada O-5
 LNER Class O5, a subclass of the LNER Class O4, locomotive class
 O-5, the pay grade for the following officer ranks in the U.S. uniformed services:
 Lieutenant colonel in the Army, Marine Corps, Air Force, and Space Force
 Commander in the Navy, Coast Guard, Public Health Service Commissioned Corps, and NOAA Commissioned Officer Corps
 Otoyol 5, a toll motorway in Turkey
 The time-displaced X-Men, also called "The Original 5"
The senior “overseer” position in the SCP Foundation

See also 
 5O (disambiguation)
 Five-O (disambiguation)